The Florida Theatre is a historic American movie theater located in Jacksonville, Florida. Opened in April 1927, it was added to the U.S. National Register of Historic Places on November 4, 1982. On April 18, 2012, the AIA's Florida Chapter placed the building  on its list of Florida Architecture: 100 Years. 100 Places.

The theatre is one of only four remaining high-style movie palaces built in Florida during the Mediterranean Revival architectural boom of the 1920s (the other three being the Saenger Theatre in Pensacola, the Polk Theatre in Lakeland and the Tampa Theatre in Tampa).

History

Golden Age of Hollywood: 1926—1960

The Florida Theatre began construction in summer of 1926 by Southern Enterprises, Inc. with R. E. Hall & Co. and Roy A. Benjamin as the architects. The theatre was established as a seven-story concrete fireproof building with a roof garden and with an emphasis on showing movies and live performances. R. E. Hall and Roy A. Benjamin designed the Florida Theatre in the Mediterranean Revival architecture style. The site of the Florida Theatre was previously occupied by a police station and jail but was demolished. Construction of the theatre took only one year and was opened to the public on April 8, 1927. At the time of the opening the Florida Theatre was the largest theatre in Florida. The opening night had several programs featuring fanfare of the American Legion Bugle Corps, a live stage show, and the film Let It Rain. The Florida Theatre was open from 11:00 AM to 11:00 PM showing a variety of films, news reels, or a stage presentation. In 1938 the roof garden was closed and replaced with offices to be rented out.

On August 10–11, 1956 Elvis Presley played two shows at the Florida Theatre to the dislikes of Jacksonville's city leadership. A committee was formed and Judge Marion Gooding prepared arrest warrants due to Presley's bodily movements and influence on the local youth. Gooding and Elvis had a private meeting where Gooding threatened to execute the warrants if Elvis disobeyed his orders. Elvis performed the show with no action from the police or Gooding.

Decline and Renovations: 1960—present
By the 1970s, the Florida Theatre was in decline and on May 8, 1980 it was forced to close. The historical significance of the Florida Theatre and its architecture led to a $500,000 grant from the State of Florida and a $350,000 grant from the City of Jacksonville HUD Community Development Block Grant with an additional $150,000 from fundraising. On October 31, 1981 the Florida Theatre was purchased by the Arts Assembly of Jacksonville for $1 million. The Arts Assembly immediately began restoring the dilapidated building with $5 million. The Florida Theatre was also at the time placed on the National Register of Historic Places on December 28, 1982. One year later on August 26, 1983, the newly renovated Florida Theatre was reopened to the public.  On October 1, 1987 the Florida Theatre separated from the Arts Assembly as an independent entity governed by its own board of directors. The Florida Theatre today is the permanent home of the Florida Ballet, Theatreworks, and the annual Community Nutcracker.

References

 Duval County listings at National Register of Historic Places
 Florida's Office of Cultural and Historical Programs
 Duval County listings
 Florida Theatre

External links
 

History of Jacksonville, Florida
National Register of Historic Places in Jacksonville, Florida
Cinemas and movie theaters in Florida
Movie palaces
Theatres in Jacksonville, Florida
Theatres completed in 1927
Mediterranean Revival architecture in Florida
Downtown Jacksonville
Northbank, Jacksonville
Theatres on the National Register of Historic Places in Florida
1927 establishments in Florida